This is the list of The Late Show with Stephen Colbert episodes that aired in 2019.

2019

January

February

March

April

May

June

July

August

September

October

November

December

References

External links
 
 Lineups at Interbridge 
 

Episodes 2019
2019 American television seasons
Lists of American non-fiction television series episodes
Lists of variety television series episodes